A mini sprint is an American type of open-wheel racing vehicle. Mini sprint cars resemble the shape of a full-size sprint car and the size of a midget car.  Although often used liberally to describe several different types of motorcycle-powered open-wheel racing cars, the term mini sprint actually applies to cars that have an upright-style chassis (the driver sits upright in the seat as in a sprint or midget), a center-mounted 4-cylinder motorcycle engine with a displacement between 750 to 1200cc, and dimensions and appearance that are similar to today’s midget.  Mini sprints are chain driven and use  wheels and tires.

The car

The mini-sprint shares overall dimensions that are similar if not identical to a full-size midget. In fact many competitors are actually making use of old midget chassis. Mini-sprints are exclusively front-engined cars that have their engines located near the middle of the chassis. (this is opposed to modified midgets or super-lites that have their engine located radically offset to the left). Mini-sprints also share suspensions that are identical to sprints and midgets. The most popular chassis is the four bar. This is a suspension system that makes use of 4 torsion bars (2 front / 2 rear) that use torsion arms and shocks to regulate suspension travel. Some cars will run with a wing on top to help with downforce the get the car to stick to the track. Others will run without a wing to let the car slide for more exciting racing.

However, there is a growing number of cars that use a torsion bar rear set-up with a coil-over front set-up.  This means the rear of the car has a torsion bar system that is identical to the 4 bar set-up, while the front-end uses shocks with coil springs.  Mini-sprints use a solid, live rear axle that is positioned in the chassis by a Jacobs Ladder or panhard bar.  Unlike the midget or the sprint car, the final drive on a mini-sprint is a roller chain.  This is one of the keys to keeping the cost of this form of racing down.  A chain drive system might cost around $300, whereas a quick-change rear end like those used on sprints and midgets cost upwards of  $2,000.  Gearing on a mini-sprint is determined by changing either the front or rear sprocket or a combination of both.  Mini-sprints make use of 13-inch wheels and tires that are identical to those found on midgets.  Most mini-sprints make use of a steering box, but a few manufacturers use steering racks.  Mini sprints carry their fuel in the rear of the car in tanks that vary from 5 to 19 US gallons.  They have roll cages that are constructed of at least -inch, .095 wall Chromoly tubing.  Many organizations are now requiring thicker tubing. The cars can reach upwards of 100 miles per hour which is why the tubing is needed to be thicker.

References

Sprint car racing
Racing car classes